This is a list of rulers of the General Government, which from 26 October 1939 until 19 January 1945 comprised the German-occupied parts of Poland. On October 8th, 1939, the Reich Interior Ministry drafted two bills, one to incorporate the western and northern portions of Poland into the German Reich, and the other for the creation of a 'General Government' in the remaining German-held territory.  The German Governor-General and the deputy of that office, the Secretary for State, were the officers that held executive power in the territory.

Government of the General Government

Governor-General of the General Government

Secretary for State of the General Government

Governmental Standards

Notes

References

.
Nazi Germany ministers
Holocaust perpetrators
Holocaust perpetrators in Poland
General Government
Poland, Rulers
General Government
1930s in Poland
1940s in Poland